Hanoi Police Football Club is a Vietnamese professional association football club based in Hanoi, Vietnam, that will compete in the 2023 V.League 1, the highest division of Vietnamese football. Its predecessor was the People's Public Security FC, which changed its name into the current name Hanoi Police (Công An Hà Nội) after being promoted to V.League 1 from the 2023 season.

Establishment 
In 1954, Minister of Public Security Tran Quoc Hoan directed then-Hanoi City Public Security Director Nguyen Van Long to study and establish a football team. On October 10, 1956, perhaps only after The Cong, the team immediately proved its position as the most worthy opponent of the successful team wearing the soldier's shirt as soon as The Cong stormed the Northern Vietnamese football. Known for their annoying counter-attacking play, the team is always a nasty opponent against any strong team, but is relatively erratic when playing against weaker teams. Perhaps that's why the team's record is not commensurate with the strength and tradition that the team possesses. 

The second half of the 90s of the 20th century can be said to be an unfortunate period for the team when with a relatively equal lineup of players, but the team is more known for its betting scandals and borrowing points. than achievements on the field. In 1992, the team performed poorly and had to be relegated to A1. In the 1995 season, the team again won the right to be promoted to the Major League (currently V.League 1).

Dissolution 
In the period of changing the mechanism in how to make football, a football team of players on the staff of the Public Security could not exist. In 2002, the team was dissolved and transferred to Vietnam Airlines at 2003 V-League. After the 2003 tournament, the Vietnam Aviation team was also dissolved. The relegation spot in the V-League was sold to ACB Sports Joint Stock Company. This company also accepted eight players from Vietnam Airlines into the football team Hanoi ACB. The rest of the players were transferred to play Vietnamese National Football First League with the team Hoa Phat Hanoi. The capital's Public Security team after nearly 50 years is considered as no longer participating in football life.

Convert
On April 7, 2008, Lieutenant General Nguyễn Khánh Toàn, the then-Deputy Minister of Public Security (Vietnam) signed the Decision No. 375/QD-BCA (X15) on the establishment of the CAND. Several clubs in the name of the Public Security force had existed before.

Reset 
In November 2022, implementing the "Project on development of the CAND football club in a professional direction", General To Lam, Politburo member, Minister Ministry of Public Security directing the transfer of the newly promoted "People's Public Security Club" to the management of Hanoi City Public Security and changing its name to Hanoi Public Security FC (Công an Hà Nội FC).

 Current squad As of 14 February 2023''

Club Staff

Managers
 2008–2013:  Mai Trần Hải
 2013–2014:  Nguyễn Đức Thắng
 2014–2015:  Phạm Minh Đức
 2015–2017:  Phan Bá Hùng
 2018–2022:  Nguyễn Văn Tuấn
 2022:  Vũ Quang Bảo
 2022:  Thạch Bảo Khanh
 2023–present:  Paulo Foiani

Season-by-season record (V.League 1)

Honours
V.League 2:
  Winners (1): 2022

Kit suppliers and shirt sponsors

References

External links
 
 

Football clubs in Vietnam
Police association football clubs in Vietnam
Police association football clubs